The following lists events that happened during 1940 in Australia.

Incumbents

Monarch – George VI
Governor-General – Alexander Hore-Ruthven, 1st Baron Gowrie
Prime Minister – Robert Menzies
Chief Justice – Sir John Latham

State Governors
Governor of New South Wales – John Loder, 2nd Baron Wakehurst
Governor of Queensland – Sir Leslie Orme Wilson
Governor of South Australia – Sir Malcolm Barclay-Harvey
Governor of Tasmania – Sir Ernest Clark
Governor of Victoria – Sir Winston Dugan
Governor of Western Australia – none appointed

Events

28 February – The Australian 7th Division is formed.
16 March – A state election is held in Victoria. The Country Party led by Albert Dunstan is returned to government.
14 June – The Volunteer Defence Corps is formed, a militia force based on the British Home Guard.
6 July – The Story Bridge is opened in Brisbane.
19 July – The Australian cruiser  takes part in the sinking of the Italian cruiser Bartolomeo Colleoni
1 August – The first of sixty s, is launched in Sydney.
13 August – An RAAF Lockheed Hudson crashes near Canberra, killing three members of Cabinet and the Chief of the General Staff.
3 September – The heavy cruiser  takes part in Operation Menace off Dakar.
6 September – The British prison ship  docks in Sydney, carrying refugees and prisoners of war considered a danger to British security, for internment in Hay and Tatura.
21 September – The 1940 federal election results in a hung parliament, with Prime Minister Robert Menzies remaining in office at the head of a minority government.
16 October – Country Party leader Archie Cameron resigns and is succeeded by Arthur Fadden as acting leader.
26 October – Double-decker buses replace the last cable trams in Melbourne.

Arts and literature

 Max Meldrum wins the Archibald Prize with his portrait of Dr J Forbes McKenzie
 The Man Who Loved Children by Christina Stead is published.
 The Magic Basket a musical play for children by Alfred Wheeler is published

Film
 Forty Thousand Horsemen, directed by Charles Chauvel and starring Chips Rafferty, is released

Sport
 Old Rowley wins the Melbourne Cup
 Beaulivre wins the Caulfield Cup
 Beau Vite wins the Cox Plate
 New South Wales wins the Sheffield Shield
 Eastern Suburbs win the 1940 NSWRFL season, defeating Canterbury-Bankstown 24–14. Western Suburbs finish in last place, claiming the wooden spoon.

Births
 5 January – Athol Guy, musician
 19 January – Paul Calvert, Liberal Senator for Tasmania
 17 February – Marilyn Jones, ballet dancer
 22 February – Neil Brown, politician
24 February – Ian Shelton, Australian rules football player (died 2021)
 27 February – Bill Hunter, actor (died 2011)
 1 March – Robin Gray, Premier of Tasmania (1982–1989)
 8 March – Don Barker, actor
 19 March – Andrew Taylor, poet
 20 March – Paul Neville, politician (died 2019)
 12 April – Jack Hibberd, playwright
 16 April – Marion Halligan, writer
 24 April – Trevor Kent, actor (died 1989)
 26 April – Ian Geoghegan, race car driver (died 2003)
 15 June – Ken Fletcher, tennis player (died 2006)
 17 June – Alan Murray, Australian golfer (died 2019)
 23 June – Diana Trask, country music singer
 25 June – Judy Amoore, athlete
 29 June – Ken Done, artist
 3 August – Judith Troeth, Liberal Senator for Victoria
 16 August – Bruce Beresford, film director
 18 August – Jan Owen, poet
 31 August – Jack Thompson, actor
 9 September – Hugh Morgan, businessman
 13 September – Kerry Stokes, chairman of the Seven Network
 15 September – Allan Andrews, NSW politician
 21 September – John Pochee, jazz musician (died 2022)
 3 October – Diana Warnock, radio broadcaster and politician
 4 October – Ian Kiernan, environmentalist, 1994 Australian of the Year (died 2018)
 5 October – Bob Cowper, cricketer
 15 October – Peter C. Doherty, medical researcher, Nobel Prize recipient
 19 October – Ian Causley, politician (died 2020)
 21 October – Peter Arnison, Governor of Queensland (1997–2003)
 1 November – John Bell, actor and theatre director
 4 November – John Sanderson, Governor of Western Australia (2000–2005)
 12 November – John Dowd, NSW politician
 7 December – Robin Miller, aviator and nurse (died 1975)
 19 December – Jane Mathews, judge (died 2019)

Deaths
 3 February – John Henry Michell, mathematician (b. 1863)
 5 February – Bill Wilks, New South Wales politician (b. 1863)
 8 March – Michael Kelly, Catholic archbishop (b. 1850)
 16 April – Herbert James Carter, entomologist (b. 1858)
 20 April – Sir Ernest Gaunt, naval admiral (b. 1865)
 22 June – Monty Noble, cricketer (b. 1873)
 23 June – Hugh Denis Macrossan, Queensland politician and judge (b. 1881)
 6 July – Michael O'Connor, Western Australian politician (b. 1865)
 22 July – Sir George Fuller, 22nd Premier of New South Wales (b. 1861)
 27 July – Bluey Wilkinson, speedway rider (b. 1911)
 30 July
 Arthur Merric Boyd, painter (b. 1862)
 Archibald Watson, surgeon and professor of anatomy (b. 1849)
 13 August
 James Fairbairn, Victorian politician (b. 1897)
 Henry Gullett, Victorian politician (b. 1878)
 Geoffrey Street, Victorian politician (b. 1894)
 Sir Brudenell White, 10th Chief of the General Staff (b. 1876)
 9 September – Percy Abbott, New South Wales politician (b. 1869)
 11 September – Issy Smith, soldier and Victoria Cross recipient (b. 1890)
 22 September – Robert Blackwood, New South Wales politician (b. 1861)
 2 October – Albert Green, Western Australian politician (b. 1869)
 14 October – Helen de Guerry Simpson, novelist (b. 1897)
 25 October – Thomas Waddell, 15th Premier of New South Wales (b. 1854)
 31 October
 Frank Anstey, Victorian politician (born in the United Kingdom) (b. 1865)
 John Keating, Tasmanian politician (b. 1872)
 2 November – Colin Rankin, Queensland politician and soldier (b. 1869)
 3 November – James Fowler, Western Australian politician (born in the United Kingdom) (b. 1863)
 23 November – Sir Stanley Argyle, 32nd Premier of Victoria (b. 1867)
 11 December – Belle Golding, feminist, suffragist and labour activist (b. 1864)
 20 December – Tom Foster, composer (b. 1870)

See also
 List of Australian films of the 1940s

References

 
Australia
Years of the 20th century in Australia